St Columba's may refer to:

Churches
 Cathedral of St. Eunan and St Columba, Letterkenny, Ireland
 St Columba's-by-the-Castle, Edinburgh, Scotland
 St. Columba's Cathedral, Oban, Scotland
 St. Columba's Chapel (Middletown, Rhode Island), United States
 St Columba's Church, Chester, England
 St Columba's Church, Ennis, Ireland
 St Columba's Church, London, England
 St Columba's Church, Long Tower, Northern Ireland
 St. Columba's Church, Newark, New Jersey, United States
 St Columba Church of Scotland, Glasgow, Scotland
 St. Columba Cathedral (Youngstown, Ohio), United States
 St. Columba Presbyterian Church, Vancouver, Canada

Schools and colleges
 St Columba's College, Dublin, Ireland
 St. Columba's College, Hazaribagh, India
 St. Columba's College, Largs, Scotland
 St. Columba's College, Melbourne, Australia
 St Columba's College, St Albans, England
 St Columba's High School, Clydebank, Scotland
 St Columba's High School, Gourock, Scotland
 St Columba's High School, New South Wales, Australia
 St. Columba's R.C. High School, Dunfermline, Scotland
 St. Columba's School, Delhi, India
 St Columba's School, Kilmacolm, Scotland

Sports
 Mullinalaghta St. Columba's GAA, based in County Longford, Ireland
  St. Columba’s Hurling Club merged with St. Agnes’s Football Club in 1969 to form what is now Crumlin GAA 
 Urney St. Columba's GAC based in County Tyrone, Northern Ireland
 St Columba's Cricket Club, Rhode Island, USA

See also
 Columba (disambiguation)
 St Columb (disambiguation)
 Kolumba